
The  was an annual professional wrestling tournament promoted by the JWP Joshi Puroresu promotion between 2009 and 2012. The name of the tournament was Japanese for "Summer Woman Determination Tournament" and as the name suggests, it was held during the summer. The tournament was contested in a single-elimination format, however, uniquely, every other tournament was for singles wrestlers and every other for tag teams of two wrestlers. Throughout the years, the tournament featured several outside participants, most notably from the Ice Ribbon promotion, with which JWP co-produced the 2012 "JRibbon" tournament. Kaori Yoneyama is the only wrestler to have won the tournament twice; once as a singles wrestler and once teaming with Command Bolshoi.

List of winners

2009
The first ever Natsu Onna Kettei Tournament took place during two shows on August 2, 2009. The tournament featured fourteen singles wrestlers, including six outside participants; Ayako Sato from Ito Dojo, freelancers Chihiro Oikawa, Megumi Yabushita and Toshie Uematsu, Makoto from Ice Ribbon and Yumi Ohka from Pro Wrestling Wave. Oikawa and Makoto were granted automatic spots in the second round of the tournament. The eventual tournament winner, Kaori Yoneyama, went on to unsuccessfully challenge Kayoko Haruyama for the JWP Openweight Championship on October 4.

2010
The second and first tag team Natsu Onna Kettei Tournament took place over three shows between July 24 and August 15, 2010. The tournament featured sixteen wrestlers comprising eight teams, including eight outside participants; Aja Kong and Dynamite Kansai from Oz Academy, freelancers Asami Kawasaki and Toshie Uematsu, Ayako Sato and Hanako Kobayashi from Ito Dojo, Kagetsu from Sendai Girls' Pro Wrestling and Tanny Mouse from NEO Japan Ladies Pro Wrestling.

2011
The third Natsu Onna Kettei Tournament, the second to feature singles wrestlers, took place on August 14, 2011. The tournament featured eight wrestlers, including one outside participant; Hikari Minami from Ice Ribbon. The eventual tournament winner, Tsubasa Kuragaki, went on to unsuccessfully challenge Hailey Hatred for the IMW Hybrid Fighting, JWP Openweight and TLW World Women's Championships on September 23.

2012
The fourth and to date final Natsu Onna Kettei Tournament, dubbed the "JRibbon Natsu Onna Kettei Tournament", was the second to feature tag teams and took place during two shows on July 28, 2012; an afternoon show promoted by Ice Ribbon and an evening show promoted by JWP. Eight teams entered the tournament, with each team including one wrestler from Ice Ribbon and one from JWP. The tournament led to a match for the JWP Junior and Princess of Pro-Wrestling Championships between one half of the eventual winners, Ice Ribbon's Maki Narumiya, and JWP's Rabbit Miu, whom she had pinned in her team's semifinal match. Miu eventually defeated Narumiya to retain her title.

See also
JWP Joshi Puroresu
Ice Ribbon

References

External links
JWP Joshi Puroresu's official website 
Ice Ribbon's official website 

JWP Joshi Puroresu
Ice Ribbon
Women's professional wrestling tournaments